Ramdan may refer to:

 Ramadan, Muslim holiday
 Zuhra Ramdan Agha Al-Awji, Libyan educator